Werneria is a genus of South American plants in the groundsel tribe within the sunflower family.

Species accepted by the Plants of the World Online as of December 2022: 

Several species once included in Werneria are now considered as better suited to other genera: Cremanthodium, Euryops, Hypochaeris, Misbrookea, Senecio, and Xenophyllum.

References

Senecioneae
Asteraceae genera
Flora of South America
Taxa named by Carl Sigismund Kunth